Corium may refer to:

 Corium, Latin term for the dermis, a skin layer
 Corium (Crete), a town of ancient Crete, Greece
 Corium (entomology), the thickened leathery, basal portion of an insect forewing (hemelytron). 
 Corium (moth), an insect genus
 Corium (nuclear reactor), the lava-like amalgamation of reactor core materials and components resulting from a meltdown
 Elephant's Foot (Chernobyl), nickname given to a large mass of corium formed underneath the Chernobyl Nuclear Power Plant

See also
 Coria (disambiguation)